These Serbian–Ottoman conflicts (or Serbian–Turkish conflicts) include those of medieval Serbia against the Ottoman Empire, until World War I.

Middle Ages

Early encounters

 Battle of Demotika in October 1352

Fall of the Serbian Empire
 Battle of Maritsa in September, 1371
 Battle of Dubravnica in 1381
 Battle of Pločnik in 1386
 Battle of Kosovo in 1389

Serbian Despotate
 Battle of Tripolje in 1402
 Siege of Novo Brdo in 1412
 Ottoman invasion of Serbia in 1425
 Ottoman invasion of Serbia in 1427
 Ottoman invasion of Serbia in 1437
 Ottoman invasion of Serbia in 1438
 Ottoman invasion of Serbia (1439–44)
 Crusade of Varna
 Battle of Nish (1443)
 Battle of Zlatitsa in 1443
 Battle of Kunovica in 1444
 Siege of Smederevo in 1453
 Ottoman invasion of Serbia (1454–55)
 Battle of Leskovac in 1454
 Battle of Kruševac in 1454
 Ottoman invasion and conquest of Serbia in 1459
 Siege of Belgrade in 1456
 Siege of Smederevo in 1456
 Conquest of Smederevo in 1459

In 1471, the Serbian Despotate was renewed in exile as a vassal of Hungary. Up until its demise in 1540, it spent its entirety fighting the Turks. The state provided support and auxiliary troops to the Kingdom of Hungary.

Ottoman period
Ottoman Serbia
Jovan Nenad's uprising (1526–1527)
 Long War (Ottoman wars) (1593–1606)
 Banat Uprising (1594)
 Serb Uprising of 1596–97
 Great Turkish War (1683–99)
 Pirot uprising (1737-38)
 Kočina Krajina Serb rebellion (1788)

19th century
Serbian Revolution
First Serbian Uprising
Hadži Prodan's Revolt
Second Serbian Uprising
 Herzegovina Uprising (1852–62)
 Herzegovina Uprising (1875–77)
 Serbian-Turkish Wars (1876–1878)

20th century
 First Balkan War (1912–1913)
 World War I (1914–1918)

See also
 List of wars involving Serbia
 List of wars involving the Ottoman Empire
 Ottoman wars in Europe

Citations

References

 
 
 

Ottoman–Serbian Wars
Serbia
Turkey
Ottoman